Miswaki (February 22, 1978 – December 17, 2004) was an American-bred Thoroughbred racehorse that was a Group One winner in France and a stakes race winner in the United States. He was an important sire of 97 stakes race winners and was the Leading broodmare sire in Great Britain and Ireland in 1999 and 2001.

Breeding and ownership
Bred in Florida, Miswaki was sired by the very important Mr. Prospector that became a two-time leading sire in North America and a nine-time leading broodmare sire in North America. His dam was Hopespringseternal, a daughter of Buckpasser, the 1966 American Horse of the Year and Hall of Fame inductee that became a four-time leading broodmare sire in North America.

Miswaki was purchased and raced by Etti Plesch, a prominent horsewoman in Europe, who as at the end of 2011, is the only female to have won The Derby twice, doing it first in 1961 with Psidium then with Henbit in 1980. In addition, she won the 1970 Prix de l'Arc de Triomphe with Sassafras.

Racing career
Miswaki was conditioned for racing by one of France's leading trainers, François Boutin. Raced at age two, he made four starts on grass in 1980, winning the Prix Yacowlef at Deauville-La Touques Racecourse in his debut. After a runner-up finish in Deauville's Group One Prix Morny, he won the Group One Prix de la Salamandre at Longchamp. Sent to England's Newmarket Racecourse for the Group One Dewhurst Stakes, Miswaki ran third to winner, Storm Bird.
For his three-year-old campaign in 1981, Miswaki was sent to race in the United States, where he made nine starts for Hall of Fame trainer Woody Stephens. The colt won three allowance races plus the ungraded Charles Hatton Stakes at Elmont, New York's Belmont Park.

At stud
Beginning in 1982, Miswaki spent his entire 22-year stud career at Walmac International Farm in Lexington, Kentucky. Pensioned in August 2004, he died on December 17 that same year and was buried in the equine cemetery at Walmac International.

The two most notable of Miswaki's successful progeny are the great racing mare Urban Sea, that won the 1993 Prix de l'Arc de Triomphe and is the dam of Galileo and Sea the Stars, and Black Tie Affair, the 1991 American Horse of the Year.

Miswaki sired:
 Bachelor Duke, won the 2004 Irish 2,000 Guineas
 Black Tie Affair, 1991 American Horse of the Year & Breeders' Cup Classic winner
 Etoile Montante, filly whose wins include the 2003 G1 Prix de la Forêt in France and the 2004 G2 Palomar Handicap in the United States.
 Germignaga, won the 1996 Oaks d'Italia
 Kistena, multiple stakes winner in France including the Group One Prix de l'Abbaye de Longchamp
 Marvelous Crown, won 1994 Japan Cup
 Misil, won three Group One races including the 1993 Gran Premio del Jockey Club
 Umatilla, won Karrakatta Plate, successful sire in Australia
 Urban Sea, 1993 Prix de l'Arc de Triomphe winner

Miswaki was the damsire of:
 Dalakhani, won the 2003 G1 Prix du Jockey Club
 Daylami, 1999 European Horse of the Year, winner of the G1 Breeders' Cup Turf
 Galileo, 2001 European Champion Three-Year-Old Colt
 Hernando, won the 1993 G1 Prix du Jockey Club
 Jimwaki, won the 1997 Grande Premio Brasil 
 Landseer, won 2002 G1 Poule d'Essai des Poulains
 My Typhoon,  multiple stakes winner
 Sadowa, won the 2002 Premio Regina Elena
 Sea the Stars, 2009 European Horse of the Year, winner of The Derby and Prix de l'Arc de Triomphe
 Talkin Man, 1994 Canadian Champion Two-Year-Old Colt

References
 Horses & Husbands -The Memoirs of Etti Plesch  (2007) Dovecote Press 

1978 racehorse births
2004 racehorse deaths
Racehorses bred in Florida
Racehorses trained in France
Racehorses trained in the United States
British Champion Thoroughbred broodmare sires
Thoroughbred family 16-g